Kessler Peak is a conspicuous cone-shaped peak,  high, in the Queen Alexandra Range of Antarctica, standing at the east side of Lennox-King Glacier,  west-southwest of Mount Rotolante. It was named by the Advisory Committee on Antarctic Names for Captain Charles L. Kessler, U.S. Navy, Director of Selective Service System for Virginia. Kessler was a member of the ship's party on the Byrd Antarctic Expedition (1928–30) and revisited Antarctica in 1962 and 1965.

References

Mountains of the Ross Dependency
Shackleton Coast